Angarum was the name of the royal riding post in the Persian Empire during the Achaemenid period.  In book 8, paragraph 98 of The Persian Wars, the historian Herodotus talks about the couriers: "Nothing mortal travels so fast as these Persian messengers. The entire plan is a Persian invention; and this is the method of it. Along the whole line of road there are men (they say) stationed with horses, in number equal to the number of days which the journey takes, allowing a man and horse to each day; and these men will not be hindered from accomplishing at their best speed the distance which they have to go, either by snow, rain, heat, or by the darkness of night. The first rider delivers his despatch to the second and the second passes it to the third; and so it is borne from hand to hand along the whole line, like the light in the torch-race, which the Greeks celebrate to Vulcan. The Persians give the riding post in this manner, the name of Angarum." (The angarum were called pirradazish by the Persians.)

See also
Chapar Khaneh
Royal Road
Angaria (Roman law)
Angarium

References

Postal history
Achaemenid Empire